Tseng Chun-hsin was the defending champion but lost in the first round to Markos Kalovelonis.

Aleksandar Vukic won the title after defeating Dimitar Kuzmanov 6–4, 6–4 in the final.

Seeds

Draw

Finals

Top half

Bottom half

References

External links
Main draw
Qualifying draw

Bengaluru Open II - 1
2022 Singles